The Homorod is a right tributary of the river Olt in Romania. It is formed at the confluence of its headwaters Homorodul Mare and Homorodul Mic, in the village Homorod. It discharges into the Olt in Ungra.

References

Rivers of Romania
Rivers of Brașov County